Reeve Cyster (born 25 November 1993) is a South African cricketer. He made his List A debut for Boland in the 2016–17 CSA Provincial One-Day Challenge on 26 November 2016. In September 2018, he was named in Boland's squad for the 2018 Africa T20 Cup. He made his first-class debut for Boland in the 2018–19 CSA 3-Day Provincial Cup on 14 February 2019. In September 2019, he was named in Boland's squad for the 2019–20 CSA Provincial T20 Cup.

References

External links
 

1993 births
Living people
South African cricketers
Boland cricketers
Place of birth missing (living people)